The Kamouraska river (in French: rivière Kamouraska) is a tributary of the south shore of the St. Lawrence River where it flows two km east of the center of the village of Kamouraska. This river flows in the municipalities of Saint-Gabriel-Lalemant, Mont-Carmel, Saint-Bruno-de-Kamouraska, Saint-Pascla and Kamouraska, in the Kamouraska Regional County Municipality, in the administrative region of Bas-Saint-Laurent, in province of Quebec, in Canada.

Geography 
The Kamouraska River has its source in Rang Chénard, in the eastern part of the municipality of Saint-Gabriel-Lalemant.

  towards the northeast in Saint-Gabriel-Lalemant, to the limit of Mont-Carmel;
  towards the northeast¸ by collecting the Albert stream (coming from the north), up to route 287;
  northeasterly, collecting the Roussel stream, up to the limit between Mont-Carmel and Saint-Bruno-de-Kamouraska (Township of Woodbridge);
  north, crossing the Petit-Bras road, collecting water from the Saint-Denis river (coming from the east) and crossing under the bridge of another road, up to the limit of Saint-Pascal;
  north, to the limit of Kamouraska (municipality) (village);
  north-west into Kamouraska (municipality), the last  of which served as the old boundary between Kamouraska (village) and Saint-Louis-de-Kamouraska (parish); this segment crosses route 132, up to the confluence of the river.

Toponymy 
The earliest use of the name “Kamouraska River” was noted in the deed of concession of the Kamouraska seigneury of July 15, 1674: “[…] three leagues of land abreast along of the St. Lawrence River, know: two leagues above the river called Kamouraska […]”. Since the 17th century, the name "Kamouraska River" has been found in dozens of documents and maps. About thirty official place names in Quebec contain the specific Kamouraska. The origin of this Native American term remains uncertain. This name could come from the Algonquin word akamaraska meaning "where there are rushes at the edge of the water". While in the Mi'kmaq language, this toponymic name is explained by the term kamoo, meaning "extended", and askaw, meaning "hay or rush".

In the history of this area, which dates back to the beginning of the French colony, the inhabitants have made use of about fifteen other appellations designating the Kamouraska River, some of which are still in popular use.

In the past, this waterway was designated "Pearl River" on maps. This toponymic variant was initially noted in the 1920s; it would come from the presence, at the time, of pearl mussels at the bottom of this stream. In the area upstream of the river, the tributaries were designated "Le Petit Bras" and Rivière du Petit Bras, toponymic usage beginning at the beginning of the 19th century. These variants would come from the confluence, in this sector, of the Kamouraska river and the Saint-Denis river, which was commonly referred to as “Le Grand Bras”.

The toponym “Kamouraska River” was formalized on March 7, 2006, by the Commission de toponymie du Québec.

See also
 List of rivers of Quebec

References 

Rivers of Bas-Saint-Laurent
Kamouraska Regional County Municipality